Barna Dobos (born 12 May 1970) is a Hungarian football manager.

Career 
He started his career as a youth coach. From 2005 to 2012 he has worked at Dunaújváros FC, Videoton FC and Puskás Akadémia FC. In 2012, he took over the Dunaújváros third division team as main coach, winning the championship in 2012-13 Nemzeti Bajnokság III and immediately qualifying for Nemzeti Bajnokság II.

In the 2013–2014 season, he once again performed with his team, finishing second with the Dunaújváros PASE in the second division.

In September 2018 he became the head coach of the Zalaegerszeg TE.

References 

1970 births
Living people
Hungarian football managers
Zalaegerszegi TE managers
People from Mór
Győri ETO FC managers
Nemzeti Bajnokság I managers
Sportspeople from Fejér County
Dunaújváros FC managers